Eastern Star Baptist Church was a historic Baptist church located at Church and Wagner Streets in Tarboro, Edgecombe County, North Carolina. The church was built about 1875, and was a one-story, Carpenter Gothic style building.  It was built by a Presbyterian congregation, then moved to its final location and used by the African-American Eastern Star Baptist Church starting in 1906.  It has been demolished.

It was listed on the National Register of Historic Places in 1980.

References 

African-American history of North Carolina
Baptist churches in North Carolina
Churches in Tarboro, North Carolina
Churches on the National Register of Historic Places in North Carolina
Gothic Revival church buildings in North Carolina
Churches completed in 1875
19th-century Baptist churches in the United States
National Register of Historic Places in Edgecombe County, North Carolina